Oakland is a city in Burt County, Nebraska, United States. The population was 1,244 at the 2010 census. Oakland continues to build on its strong foundation with its bi-annual Swedish Festival and is known by its proclamation from the Swedish Consul-General and the Governor of Nebraska as the "Swedish Capital of Nebraska."

Geography
Oakland is located at  (41.835133, -96.466075).

History
Oakland was named after John Oak, an early settler. The village was incorporated April 13, 1881, with 30 businesses, two banks and one printing office in operation. Basic economic activities in the Oakland area soon included farming, cattle and hog production, feed processing, wholesale and retail sales. In 1900, the Chicago, Burlington and Quincy Railroad were built to Oakland.

Oakland was home to the Swedish Basketball Classic from 1993 to 2006, which has since moved to Midland University in Fremont and changed its name to the Warrior Classic. Oakland has also been home to the Burt County Fair since 1913.

Police Chief Terry Poland embezzled nearly $15,000 in funds from Oakland according to the Nebraska State Auditor's Office in 2022. Poland purchased ice-fishing equipment, a wake surfboard, and a glass basketball backboard for personal use with city funds.

Demographics

2010 census
As of the census of 2010, there were 1,244 people, 528 households, and 343 families living in the city. The racial makeup of the city was 96.0% White, 0.5% African American, 1.3% Native American, 0.9% Asian, and 1.4% from two or more races. Hispanic or Latino of any race were 0.6% of the population.

There were 528 households, of which 28.2% had children under the age of 18 living with them, 54.2% were married couples living together, 7.6% had a female householder with no husband present, 3.2% had a male householder with no wife present, and 35.0% were non-families. 33.0% of all households were made up of individuals, and 20% had someone living alone who was 65 years of age or older. The average household size was 2.28 and the average family size was 2.85.

The median age in the city was 44.9 years. 25.2% of residents were under the age of 18; 3.2% were between the ages of 18 and 24; 21.6% were from 25 to 44; 25.7% were from 45 to 64; and 24.2% were 65 years of age or older. The gender makeup of the city was 48.9% male and 51.1% female.

2000 census
As of the census of 2000, there were 1,367 people, 565 households, and 371 families living in the city. The population density was 1,695.3 people per square mile (651.6/km). There were 623 housing units at an average density of 772.6 per square mile (297.0/km). The racial makeup of the city was 98.68% White, 0.22% Native American, 0.15% Asian, and 0.95% from two or more races. Hispanic or Latino of any race were 0.73% of the population.

There were 565 households, out of which 25.8% had children under the age of 18 living with them, 58.4% were married couples living together, 5.7% had a female householder with no husband present, and 34.2% were non-families. 32.7% of all households were made up of individuals, and 23.2% had someone living alone who was 65 years of age or older. The average household size was 2.32 and the average family size was 2.94.

In the city, the population was spread out, with 24.2% under the age of 18, 5.0% from 18 to 24, 21.4% from 25 to 44, 20.9% from 45 to 64, and 28.5% who were 65 years of age or older. The median age was 45 years. For every 100 females, there were 84.5 males. For every 100 females age 18 and over, there were 80.5 males.

As of 2000 the median income for a household in the city was $32,663, and the median income for a family was $42,938. Males had a median income of $31,600 versus $19,583 for females. The per capita income for the city was $16,916. About 3.8% of families and 6.2% of the population were below the poverty line, including 3.2% of those under age 18 and 9.1% of those age 65 or over.

Notable people
Oakland is the birthplace of Jon Kyl, U.S. Senator from Arizona, and Curt Bromm, the former Speaker of the Nebraska Legislature.

References

 
Cities in Burt County, Nebraska
Cities in Nebraska
Swedish-American culture in Nebraska